The Vanier Centre for Women in Milton, Ontario is a medium and maximum correctional facility for female offenders serving sentences of less than two years or who have been arrested and are remanded in custody awaiting trial. The institution has capacity for 333 inmates.

The current facility was opened in 2003 on the campus of the Maplehurst Correctional Complex replacing an older facility in Brampton, Ontario which had been opened in 1967 to house the Ontario Women's Guidance Centre, and the Ontario Women's Treatment Centre and was then renamed the Vanier Centre for Women in 1970 when it was consolidated with the former Andrew Mercer Reformatory for Women.

Services for French-speaking people are offered at this facility.

See also
 Andrew Mercer Reformatory for Women

References

Buildings and structures in the Regional Municipality of Halton
Milton, Ontario
Prisons in Ontario
Women's prisons in Canada
Women in Ontario